The Common Touch is the seventh studio album by Australian alternative rock band Custard, released on 6 October 2017 by ABC Music. It was supported by the singles "In the Grand Scheme of Things (None of This Really Matters)" and "2000 Woman".

Critical reception 

Writing for the Sydney Morning Herald, Bronwyn Thompson described the album as "a varied and focused record that shows the band's eagerness to move beyond their quirky slacker pop 'golden days'".

Tracklist 

 "In the Grand Scheme of Things (None of This Really Matters)" (David McCormack) –
 "Halley's Comet" (McCormack)
 "I'm Not Well" (McCormack)
 "Princes HWY" (McCormack)
 "Sinking Deep" (McCormack)
 "You Always Knew" (McCormack)
 "Hands on Fire" (Glenn Thompson)
 "Armageddon" (McCormack)
 "Dr. Huxley Creeper" (McCormack)
 "2000 Woman" (McCormack)
 "Police Cars" (G. Thompson, Wintah Thompson, Nellie Pollard-Wharton)
 "Take It From Here" (McCormack)

Personnel 

Custard
 Paul Medew: bass guitar
 Matthew Strong: lead guitar
 David McCormack: electric guitar
 Glenn Thompson: drums

Additional musicians
 Jack Ward: cello (tracks 1, 4, 12)
 Little Roy Grunt: harmonica (track 1)
 Desmond Honeybottom: piccolo trumpet (track 1)
 Jy-Perry Bankes: pedal steel guitar (tracks 2, 4, 12)
 Meghan Drummond: backing vocals (tracks 3, 5, 12)
 Adele Pickvance: backing vocals (track 6)
 Nellie Pollard-Wharton: backing vocals (tracks 7, 11), keyboards (track 11)
 Anwyn Watkins, Haylee Poppi, Matteo Zingles: backing vocals (track 10)

Recording details
 Producer: David McCormack, Glenn Thompson
 Recorded by: Thompson, McCormack; Evan McHugh at Linear studio Sydney, Tim Whitten at Rancom Street studio Sydey
 Mixer: Thompson
 Mastering: J J Golden

Artworks
 Glenn Thompson: artwork, design
 Peter Fischmann: photographs

References 

2017 albums
Custard (band) albums